Mario Hohn (born 28 March 1989) is a German footballer who plays as a midfielder.

Career
Hohn made his professional debut for VfR Aalen in the 3. Liga on 4 October 2008, coming on as a substitute in the 74th minute for Marijo Marić in the 0–3 away loss against Union Berlin.

References

External links
 Profile at DFB.de
 Profile at kicker.de
 FC Nöttingen statistics at Fussball.de
 TSV Essingen statistics at Fussball.de
 SGM Riexingen statistics at Fussball.de

1989 births
Living people
People from Bietigheim-Bissingen
Sportspeople from Stuttgart (region)
Footballers from Baden-Württemberg
German footballers
Association football midfielders
VfR Aalen players
FC Nöttingen players
3. Liga players
Regionalliga players